Ali Omar Musa Khwayleh is a retired Jordanian football player who played as a left winger.

References

External links 
 

1988 births
Living people
Jordanian footballers
Association football forwards
Al-Ramtha SC players
Al-Yarmouk FC (Jordan) players
Mansheyat Bani Hasan players
Jordanian Pro League players